Ashwani Kumar Bansal was an Indian legal educational administrator. He was Vice-Chancellor of two Universities Maharaja Surajmal Brij University and Raj Rishi Bhartrihari Matsya University.

Career 
He previously worked at University of Delhi. He started BA.LLB and BBA.LLB in Maharaja Surajmal Brij University, in Bharatpur, Rajasthan in 2018. He also introduced MSB Law Journal in 2018.

Books

References

Living people
Academic staff of Delhi University
Place of birth missing (living people)
Year of birth missing (living people)